In the Blood is a psychological thriller by bestselling author Lisa Unger. It is a standalone novel, but takes place in The Hollows.

Awards and honors
In the Blood was chosen as an INDIE NEXT pick and Amazon.com Editors' Pick – Best Books of the Month: Mystery, Thriller & Suspense for January, 2014

References

2014 American novels
American crime novels
Novels by Lisa Unger
Simon & Schuster books
Touchstone Books books